Yuki Bhambri and Saketh Myneni were the defending champions but chose not to defend their title.

Nam Ji-sung and Song Min-kyu won the title after defeating Jan Choinski and Stuart Parker 6–4, 6–4 in the final.

Seeds

Draw

References

External links
 Main draw

Nonthaburi Challenger III - Doubles